Scott Evans (born 26 September 1987 in Dublin) is a former Irish professional badminton player. As of 2017 he was the highest ranked Irish player.

Evans has represented Ireland at the 2008, 2012, and 2016 Olympic Games. He became the first Irishman to win a badminton match at the Olympic during his last participation in 2016. He won the men's singles Irish National Badminton Championships eight consecutive times from 2005 to 2012, becoming the only player to equal James 'Chick' Doyle's record of eight consecutive Irish Men's singles titles.

He attended Wesley College Dublin. In his youth Evans played for Irish association football club Leicester Celtic A.F.C.

Career
Evans has played two-time Olympic gold medalist China's Lin Dan and world No. 1 Malaysia's Lee Chong Wei 3 times each. At the 2011 BWF World Championships, Evans met the second seed and eventual champion Lin Dan in the second round and came out with a 15–21, 16–21 loss. Nearly one year later at the 2012 London Olympics, Evans again met the eventual winner Lin Dan of China in the first round and was defeated 8–21, 14–21. At the 2013 BWF World Championships, Evans lost to top seed and eventual silver medalist Lee Chong Wei of Malaysia in the first round with a score of 14–21, 15–21. Evans moved to Denmark at the age of 16 to pursue his professional career joining Danish club Greve. After 1 season at Greve Evans moved to Gentofte Badminton club where he spent the next 11 years playing for the clubs first team. In 2017 he moved to TSS and played there for 2 years losing in the final of the Danish league both Years. After retiring from badminton Evans returned to Gentofte badminton club to act as head coach for the club for the next 2 years. He is current assistant head coach in Solrod Badminton Club.

2016 Summer Olympics

Evans qualified for the 2016 Summer Olympics in the men's singles category. In the group stage, he was put with Germany's Marc Zwiebler and host Brazil's Ygor Coelho de Oliveira. He became the first Irishman to win a badminton game at an Olympics as he beat Zwiebler 9–21, 21–17, 21–7. Evans then won the second match against Ygor Coelho de Oliveira 21–8, 19–21, 21–8. The result means Evans would be qualified for the Round of 16, which he would then face Denmark's Viktor Axelsen. Evans lost to Axelsen 16–21, 12–21 in the round of 16. Evans finished Rio olympic games in 9th position confirming the best ever result in an olympic games for Irish Badminton.

Titles

 BWF International Series tournament
 BWF Grand Prix tournament

Highlights
2016 – Irish Open: Men's singles (runner up)
2014 – Bitburger Open: Men's singles (runner up)
2014 – Bulgarian International: Men's singles (runner up)
2011 – Denmark International: Men's singles (semi final)
2010 – European Championships: Men's singles (quarter final)
2009 – Scottish Open: Men's singles (semi final)
2008 – Scott Evans secures qualification to 2008 Summer Olympics
2006 – Southern PanAm International: Men's singles (semi final)
2006 – Portuguese International: Men's doubles (quarter final)
2005 – Hungarian International: Men's singles (runner up)
2002 – Helexpo Thessaloniki World Grand Prix: Men's doubles (quarter final)
2004 – Welsh International: Men's singles (quarter final)
2004 – Italian International: Men's doubles (runner up)
2004 – Cyprus International: Men's singles (quarter final)
2004 – Cyprus International: Men's doubles (runner up)
2004 – Victor Lithuanian International: Men's doubles (runner up)
2003 – Italian International: Mixed doubles (quarter final)
2002 – Irish International: Men's doubles (quarter final)

Hosbjerg

Evans is Co owner with his wife at Danish ladies fashion brand Hosbjerg. They started the company together in 2014.

References

External links
http://www.scottevansireland.com
One of Ireland's Olympic stars explains how tough it is to be a full-time athlete on €12,000 per year
https://www.irishtimes.com/sport/other-sports/scott-evans-badminton-1.2739397 
https://www.independent.ie/sport/other-sports/olympian-scott-evans-announces-his-retirement-from-international-badminton-36572943.html
https://www.the42.ie/scott-evans-retirement-badminton-career-3837090-Feb2018/
https://www.independent.ie/sport/other-sports/irish-badminton-star-scott-evans-im-good-enough-to-be-in-the-worlds-top-20-34654326.html
https://www.the42.ie/scott-evans-badminton-retirement-3836479-Feb2018/
https://www.the42.ie/day-in-the-life-scott-evans-2553548-Jan2016/
https://www.hosbjerg.com 

1987 births
Living people
Badminton players at the 2008 Summer Olympics
Badminton players at the 2012 Summer Olympics
Badminton players at the 2015 European Games
Badminton players at the 2016 Summer Olympics
European Games competitors for Ireland
Leicester Celtic A.F.C. players
Irish male badminton players
Olympic badminton players of Ireland
Association footballers not categorized by position
People educated at Wesley College, Dublin
Republic of Ireland association footballers
Association footballers from County Dublin